África Ivonne Lechuga Zavala (born 12 August 1985 in Mexico City) is a Mexican actress.

Biography

2000s
Graduated from the CEA of Televisa, 
she began her career at age 21 starring in the telenovela Peregrina next to Eduardo Capetillo.

Later in 2006, she starred in the telenovela Código postal alongside José Ron and Jessica Coch. 
In 2008 she obtained a starring role in the telenovela Cuidado con el ángel as Elsa Maldonado San Román, cousin of the protagonist of the telenovela, sharing credits with Maite Perroni.

In 2009, she received another starring role and traveled to Argentina to record the telenovela Los Exitosos Pérez alongside Ludwika Paleta and Jaime Camil.

2010s
In 2010 she was selected to be one of the six protagonists in the telenovela Para Volver a amar beside Rebecca Jones, Nailea Norvind, Alejandra Barros, Sophie Alexander and Zaide Silvia Gutiérrez. In 2011 she starred in the telenovela Amorcito Corazón next to Elizabeth Álvarez, Diego Olivera and Daniel Arenas.

In July 2012 the producer José Alberto Castro confirmed that África Zavala would be the star of his  telenovela Corona de lágrimas next to Victoria Ruffo.

In 2014 she starred in José Alberto Castro's La malquerida alongside Victoria Ruffo, Ariadne Díaz and Alberto Estrella.

In 2015 she starred in the telenovela Amores con trampa alongside Itatí Cantoral, Eduardo Yáñez and Ernesto Laguardia.

Filmography

Awards and nominations

TVyNovelas Awards

References

External links
 África Zavala biography at esmas.com
 

Actresses from Mexico City
Mexican film actresses
Mexican telenovela actresses
Living people
1985 births